The North Coast Overnight Express was an Australian passenger train operated by the State Rail Authority from July 1982 until November 1988.

It operated from Sydney via the North Coast line to Murwillumbah. It was formed of air-conditioned HUB/RUB stock but despite being a night train, conveyed no sleeping accommodation. It's headcode was NL5/NL6.

In October 1985 it was truncated to Grafton and ceased operating in November 1988.

References

Named passenger trains of New South Wales
Night trains of Australia
Railway services introduced in 1982
Passenger rail transport in New South Wales
1982 establishments in Australia
1988 disestablishments in Australia
Railway services discontinued in 1988
Discontinued railway services in Australia